Alphamstone is a village and civil parish in Essex, England. The village is in the district of Braintree and in the parliamentary constituency of Saffron Walden. The parish is part of the Stour Valley South parish cluster. The population is included in the civil parish of Lamarsh.

The village is a mile west of the River Stour, which forms the Essex-Suffolk county-border in the local area. The village has one parish church, the C of E St Barnabas. It was built in the thirteenth century and went through restorations in the 16th and 19th centuries. In 1831 the population of the village was 244 inhabitants.

Its nearest significant road link is the A131.

References

External links 
 
 http://www.essexchurches.info - Alphamstone Church on Essex Churches website
 GENUKI reference library on Alphamstone
 

Villages in Essex
Braintree District